Loghill Village is a Census-designated place (CDP) in and governed by Ouray County, Colorado, United States. The CDP is a part of the Montrose, CO Micropolitan Statistical Area. The population of the Loghill Village CDP was 521 at the United States Census 2010. The Ridgway post office  serves Loghill Village postal addresses.

Geography

Loghill Village is located on Log Hill Mesa north of the town of Ridgway and northeast of Pleasant Valley. Loghill Village borders Ridgway State Park and Eldredge, though there is no direct road access between the two. Via road, Loghill Village is nearest to the town of Ridgway which can be seen from its position on the mesa.

Loghill is primarily covered in large Ponderosa Pine trees, piñons and junipers. Wildlife is abundant on the Mesa with a fairly large population of Mule Deer, Elk, Bobcats, Lynxes, Black Bears (of various colors), wild turkeys and an occasional sighting of mountain lions. Almost 1,000 feet higher than Ridgway, the types and sizes of flora vary greatly. For example, Aspen trees are seen here and there on the mesa, as opposed to the lower Ridgway valley where they are scarce. Aspens can be seen more abundantly in the foothills and mid mountain areas of the San Juan Mountains and Cimarrons.

Demographics

Communities
Loghill Village is divided into two main communities by a shallow gorge, a common greenbelt, running southwest to northeast.

 Fairway Pines - A golf course residential community in the northwest of Loghill Village. All the streets in Fairway Pines take their names from animals.
 Fisher Canyon - A community north of Loghill Village with access via County Road 1.
 Loghill Village - Occupying the southeast of Log Hill mesa where most of the streets take their names from trees. This community gives its name to the larger community (CDP).

Tourism
Loghill Village is primarily a residential community. There is some tourism at the golf course, the former Fairway Pines Golf Course which is now known as the Divide Ranch and Club Golf Course. There is a bar and grill restaurant, open seasonally, at the Divide golf course club house. The Loghill Village Park and Recreation Department maintains a matrix of trails on the mesa with a combined length of more than six miles. The Escarpment trail has several lookout points overlooking the town of Ridgway and Pleasant Valley with views of the Sneffels Range and Cimmaron Range. No wheeled traffic is allowed on the hiking trails.

Infrastructure

Transportation
Loghill Village can be reached by exiting west off of U.S. Route 550 and north off State Highway 62. The latter road is also part of the San Juan Skyway Scenic Byway.

See also

 List of census-designated places in Colorado
 Ridgway State Park

References

External links

 
 Ouray County website
 Ridgway State Park

Census-designated places in Ouray County, Colorado
Census-designated places in Colorado